Rainberg is a mountain, in the city of Salzburg, Salzburgerland, Austria.

Height
It is 511 meters high.

See also

 Salzburg
 Salzburgerland

Mountains of Salzburg